My Dog Killer is a 2013 Slovak drama film written and directed by Mira Fornay. The film was selected as the Slovak entry for the Best Foreign Language Film at the 86th Academy Awards, but was not nominated.

Cast
 Adam Mihál
 Marián Kuruc
 Irena Bendová
 Libor Filo

See also
 List of submissions to the 86th Academy Awards for Best Foreign Language Film
 List of Slovak submissions for the Academy Award for Best Foreign Language Film

References

External links
 

2013 films
2013 drama films
Slovak-language films
Skinhead films
Sun in a Net Awards winners (films)
Golden Kingfisher winners
2010s gang films
Slovak drama films